Velise River is a river in Pärnu and Rapla County, Estonia. The river is 82.9 km long and basin size is 867.8 km2. It runs into Vigala River.

References

Rivers of Estonia
Pärnu County
Rapla County